Mohamed Abdel Aziz Khalifa (born 1925) is an Egyptian former swimmer. He competed in the men's 4 × 200 metre freestyle relay at the 1948 Summer Olympics and the water polo tournaments at the 1948, 1952 and 1960 Summer Olympics.

See also
 Egypt men's Olympic water polo team records and statistics

References

External links
 

1925 births
Possibly living people
Egyptian male swimmers
Egyptian male water polo players
Olympic swimmers of Egypt
Olympic water polo players of Egypt
Swimmers at the 1948 Summer Olympics
Water polo players at the 1948 Summer Olympics
Water polo players at the 1952 Summer Olympics
Water polo players at the 1960 Summer Olympics
Place of birth missing (living people)
20th-century Egyptian people